Baisha is a town of Minhou County, Fujian, China. , it has 4 residential communities and 21 villages under its administration.

References

Township-level divisions of Fujian
Minhou County